M. Jothiprakasam (2 April 1952 – 10 July 2015), better known as Leo Muthu, was an Indian philanthropist, educationist and businessman. He was the Founder-Chairman of the "Sairam Institutions", which operates many secondary and tertiary educational institutions. His name to be officially used is MJF.Ln.Leo Muthu.

Early life
Leo Muthu was born in 1952 in Thiruthuraipoondi Village, Thiruvarur District, Tamil Nadu to K G Manickam-Nagalakshmi. He started his career in real estate in 1972.

Promotion of education
Leo Muthu founded the educational trusts to serve for the cause of quality secondary grade and higher education to the learner community. The group of colleges under the trusts offers education across technical, management studies, research, shipping science and alternative medicine streams and more. About 25,000 students are being given the benefit of education per year through the group’s schools and colleges.

Sapthagiri Educational Trust runs the following institutions in Tamil Nadu and Puducherry:
Sri Sai Ram Engineering College, Chennai
Sri Sairam Institute of Management Studies, Chennai
Sri Sairam Institute of Computer Applications, Chennai
Sri Sairam Institute of Technology, Chennai
Sri Sairam Siddha Medical College and Research Centre, Chennai
Sri Sairam Ayurveda Medical College and Research Centre, Chennai
Sri Sairam Homoeopathy Medical College and Research Centre, Chennai
Sai Ram Advanced Centre for Research, Chennai.
Sai Ram Matriculation Hr.School, Goripalayam, Madurai
Sai Ram Polytechnic College, Eliyarpathy, Madurai
Sri Sairam College of Education, Puducherry
Sai Ram Matriculation school, Thiruvarur
Sai Ram Vidyalaya, Madipakkam, Chennai.
Sai Ram Vidyalaya, Puducherry
Institutions run by Leo Muthu Educational Trust include:
Sri Sai Ram Polytechnic College, Chennai
Sai Matriculation Higher Secondary School, Chennai
Sai Ram Matriculation Hr.School, Chennai
Sai Ram Matriculation Hr. School, Thiruthuraipoondi
The institutions run under Sapthagiri Educational and Charitable Trust are the following:
Sri Sairam College of Engineering, formerly Shirdi Sai Engineering College, Anekal, Bangalore.
Shirdi Sai Pre University college, Anekal, Bangalore.

Promotion of Industries

Leo Muthu started business enterprises in real estate development in Tamil Nadu and neighbouring states. He also set up manufacturing industries.

Leo Muthu was the Managing Partner of Leo Real Estates and Managing Director of Leo Housing (P) Ltd., in Chennai. In his housing business, he introduced over 75 housing schemes and industrial complexes in and around the suburbs of Chennai, Madurai, Hosur and Bangalore. For his innovative real estate and construction ventures, Leo Muthu was awarded the “Best Real Estate Promoter Award” by the former Governor of Tamil Nadu, Shri B. N. Singh.

Leo Muthu was also the Managing Director of Super Fibre Glass (P) Ltd., a SSI manufacturing unit of Fibre Glass Sleeves and Chords, at Chennai which is a supplier to Lucas TVS, English Electric Co., and Kirloskar Co., among others. He also ran Sri Sai Raj Printers, a printing company, Super Sea Food Products Pvt. Ltd, Tuticorin, a fish products company, and Sai Jothi Quarry, Chennai, which is engaged in quarrying stones.

Philanthropy

As a philanthropist, Leo Muthu was committed to the cause of improving the lives of people in poverty and donated lands and buildings to the Government of Tamil Nadu, social organizations, orphan homes, Lions and Rotary Clubs. He was awarded the Melvin Jones Fellowship after he took charge as the President of Lions Club in the 1990s. He donated about 16.5 acres of land in Thiruthuraipoondi, his birthplace, in support of the state government’s scheme for opening an engineering college and high school in every district of the state.
 
He was a generous contributor to educational funding and scholarships for school and college students. He made regular donations for the construction of temples and mass marriages, free medical camps, social awareness camps and blood donation camps.

References

1952 births
2015 deaths
Indian industrialists
People from Tiruvallur district
20th-century Indian educational theorists
Businesspeople from Tamil Nadu
20th-century Indian philanthropists